Bubembe Island is an island in Lake Victoria inside the country of Uganda. In the religion of the Buganda people, it is the home of the temple of Mukasa.

Overview

Bubembe Island is one of 84 islands in Lake Victoria known as the Ssese Islands. The islands belong to the Kalangala District and lie in the north-western section of Lake Victoria. Many of the 84 islands are uninhabited except for a few fishermen, and the forests and swamps around some of the coasts make the islands a good habitat for birds, including whale-headed stork, herons, geese, grey parrot, kingfishers, and fish eagles. The virtually virgin land is rich in plant life, and many, of the species are reportedly new to botanists.

Culture

In the religion of the Buganda people, Bubembe Island is the home of the temple of Mukasa.

Wildlife

The wildlife on the islands includes hippopotamus and crocodile, found near the shores. Waterbuck roam freely, as does the shy sitatunga antelope. In the forested areas, chimpanzees and monkeys swing from the trees. Vervet monkey, colobus monkey, a prolific variety of water and forest birds including hornbill, touraco, flycatcher, weaver, fish eagle, paradise flycatcher, colourful butterflies are common.

Environmental destruction

Recently, the vegetable oil producer Bidco has started to bulldoze parts of the island to set up monocultures of oil palm, used for cosmetics and biofuels. After violent protests, the Ugandan government has stopped further destruction for the moment, but the unique biosphere is currently under serious threat.

Access

Bubembe island is a 9-hour steamer trip from Port Bell, or 45 minutes by the local ferry from Bukakata. From Bugala Island it is a 3-hour boat ride to Bukasa Island or 2 hours to Bubembe.

Notes

Lake islands of Uganda
Islands of Lake Victoria
Palm oil production in Uganda